Buffalo River State Park may refer to:

 Buffalo River State Park (Arkansas)
 Buffalo River State Park (Minnesota)